Siavash Akbarpour (born January 21, 1981in Shiraz, Iran) is an Iranian former footballer and current coach .

Club career
He started his professional career in Fajr Sepasi, and moved to Iranian giants Esteghlal in 2004, Where he made and excellent partnership with Reza Enayati in the front. He was one of the club's main players in its 2005–06 IPL championship. In July 2007 he moved to the UAE and joined Al-Dhafra. In 2008 transfer window he again joined Iranian giants Esteghlal again and won the league in his first season after many impressive matches. He signed a contract with Tractor Sazi on 18 June 2011. On 1 July 2012, he signed a two years contract with Esteghlal.

Club career statistics
Last Update  17 January 2014 

 Assist Goals

International career

Under-23 national team
He is a technically sound player who was first called up to the Iran national under-23 football team in the 2002 Asian Games, although because of his lack of experience he was ineffective. He was also part of the Iranian squad in Athens 2004 Olympics unsuccessful qualification campaign. Where he was kicked out of the camp when Mohammad Mayeli Kohan was the head coach because of discipline problems and returned after he left the job and called up again by Hossein Faraki.

Senior national team
After his role in Esteghlal's league championship, his former coach, Amir Ghalenoei, called Akbarpour to the senior Iran national football team. He made his debut in the 2007 Asian Cup qualification match against Taiwan in February 2006. His next cap was against UAE in which he assisted his former teammate Reza Enayati's goal. He returned to Team Melli in 2009 under Ali Daei and played few minutes again South Korea in February 2009 where the match finished 1-1 in Tehran.

Beyond football

Personal life
In 2005, Siavash Akbarpour married Soudabeh Tarzi, a former lawyer in city of Tehran. They have two daughters. Their first daughter was born in 2006 her name in Sarina, in Tehran. In 2010 their second daughter Selina was born. They divorced in 2014. Siavash Akbarpour was engaged after few months of dating in 2016. During an interview Akbarpour said, "We're two people who are really happy and in love."

Honours
Esteghlal
Iran Pro League (3): 2005–06, 2008–09, 2012–13

References

1985 births
Living people
Iranian footballers
Iran international footballers
Association football forwards
Persian Gulf Pro League players
Fajr Sepasi players
Esteghlal F.C. players
Iranian expatriate footballers
People from Shiraz
Asian Games gold medalists for Iran
Asian Games medalists in football
Footballers at the 2002 Asian Games
Medalists at the 2002 Asian Games
Expatriate footballers in the United Arab Emirates
Sportspeople from Fars province